William Lionel Murton (2 June 1915 – 26 September 2006) was an English character actor. Born in Wandsworth, London, he was resident at Little Orchard, Weston Road, Upton Grey, Basingstoke, Hampshire, England, before his death at age 91. He was cremated at Basingstoke Crematorium on 6 October 2006. He is commemorated with his wife, Anita, in Upton Grey Churchyard, Grave 1 E-3.

Having grown up in Montreal, Quebec, Canada, he most often played Americans and Canadians in films and in various television series, from the late 1940s. He also appeared in episodes of several TV series, including The Persuaders! and Danger Man and was a regular cast member of the Dickie Henderson Show, playing Dickie's friend Jack.

Selected filmography

 Meet the Navy (1946) - Johnny
 Brass Monkey (1948) - Detective Mann
 Badger's Green (1949) - Albert
 The Girl Is Mine (1950)
 Dangerous Assignment (1950) - Joe Wilson
 The Long Dark Hall (1951) - Jefferson (American published) (US version only)
 The Pickwick Papers (1952) - Augustus Snodgrass
 Our Girl Friday (1953) - Barman
 Monte Carlo Baby (1953)
 The Runaway Bus (1954) - American Traveller
 Night People (1954) - Norman Lakeland
 Raising a Riot (1955) - Harry
 The Battle of the River Plate (1956) - Mike Fowler
 Interpol (1957) - Murphy
 Carry On Admiral (1957) - Psychiatrist
 Fire Down Below (1957) - The American
 Up the Creek (1958) - Perkins
 Further Up the Creek (1958) - Perkins
 The Captain's Table (1959) - Bernie Floate
 Make Mine a Million (1959) - Commercial TV director
 The Mouse That Roared (1959) - American General at the Pentagon (uncredited)
 North West Frontier (1959) - American Correspondent
 Our Man in Havana (1959)
 Surprise Package (1960) - US Marshal
 Danger Man (1960-1961) - Colonel Keller
 Petticoat Pirates (1961) - Admiral
 The Main Attraction (1962) - Joe Burton, the Drunk (uncredited)
 On the Beat (1962) - Man in Underground Train
 Summer Holiday (1963) - Jerry
 Man in the Middle (1964) - Capt. Alec Gunther
 Goldfinger (1964) - Colonel (uncredited)
 The Truth About Spring (1964) - Simmons
 Carry On Cowboy (1966) - Clerk
 Doctor in Clover (1966) - Publicity Man
 The Dirty Dozen (1967) - MP Lt. Col. in charge at hanging (uncredited)
 Sette volte sette (1968)
 Nobody Runs Forever (1968) - Reporter on Steps (uncredited)
 The Last Shot You Hear (1969) - Rubens
 Zeta One (1969) - W
 Patton (1970) - Third Army Chaplain James Hugh O'Neill
 The Games (1970) - US Team VIP (uncredited)
 The Revolutionary (1970) - The Professor
 Cannon for Cordoba (1970) - Colonel
 Confessions of a Window Cleaner (1974) - Brenda's Landlord
 Seven Nights in Japan (1976) - American Tourist
 Twilight's Last Gleaming (1977) - Col. Horne
 The Billion Dollar Bubble (1978)

References

External links
 
 http://www.bfi.org.uk/films-tv-people/4ce2b9f0964e7
 

1915 births
2006 deaths
English male stage actors
English male film actors
English male television actors
Male actors from London
People from Wandsworth
English emigrants to Canada
Male actors from Montreal
Canadian male stage actors
Canadian male film actors
Canadian male television actors